Collomia larsenii is a species of flowering plant in the phlox family known by the common name talus collomia. It is native to the Olympic Mountains of Washington and the Cascade Range from Washington to northern California, where it grows in high exposed mountainside talus. It is a perennial herb forming a clump in the volcanic rocks. The branching stem is covered in fleshy, glandular, hairy leaves, each divided into many lobes. The inflorescence is a cluster of 6 to 9 tubular purple flowers, each with a face up to 1.5 centimeters wide.

External links
Jepson Manual Treatment
University of Washington Burke Museum
Photo gallery

larsenii
Flora of California
Flora of Oregon
Flora of Washington (state)
Flora without expected TNC conservation status